Dominika Cibulková was the defending champion, but lost in the second round to Heather Watson.

Karolína Plíšková won the title, defeating Caroline Wozniacki in the final, 6–4, 6–4.

Angelique Kerber retained the WTA no. 1 singles ranking after Simona Halep lost in the quarterfinals.

Seeds
All seeds received a bye into the second round.

Draw

Finals

Top half

Section 1

Section 2

Bottom half

Section 3

Section 4

Qualifying

Seeds

Qualifiers

Lucky losers

Draw

First qualifier

Second qualifier

Third qualifier

Fourth qualifier

Fifth qualifier

Sixth qualifier

References

External links
 Main Draw
 Qualifying Draw

2017 WTA Tour
2017 Women's Singles